Calochortus simulans is a California species of flowering plant in the lily family known by the common name San Luis Obispo mariposa lily, not to be confused with the San Luis mariposa lily C. obispoensis.

Distribution
It is native to San Luis Obispo County, California, and its range extends south into the northern part of Santa Barbara County.

Description
The inflorescence is a loose cluster of 1 to 3 erect, bell-shaped flowers. The petals are white to yellow with a deep red spot at the base. The fruit is an angled capsule  in length.

References

External links
Jepson Manual Treatment
United States Department of Agriculture Plants Profile
Calphotos Photo gallery, University of California @ Berkeley,

simulans
Plants described in 1944
Endemic flora of California